Christian Fredrik Borchgrevink (born 1 September 1924) is a Norwegian medical doctor, a pioneer of bringing the subjects of family medicine and public health into an academic discipline in Norway.

He was born in Kristiania to engineer Henrik Christian Juell Borchgrevink and Wilhelmine Antonette Schibbye, and graduated as cand.med. in 1951 and dr.med. in 1961. He was decorated Knight, First Class of the Order of St. Olav in 1996.

References

1924 births
Living people
Physicians from Oslo
Norwegian public health doctors
University of Oslo alumni
Academic staff of the University of Oslo
Norwegian general practitioners